Darren Curovic (born 19 November 1966) is a Western Australian kickboxing fight promoter, a kickboxing trainer, former coach of the Australian national kickboxing team and a former Australian kickboxing representative.

Together with business partner, Blair Smith, Curovic runs one of the biggest Australian muaythai promotions, Pure Adrenaline Promotions, which conducts the Domination fight night series, which has featured some of the world's best fighters, such as John Wayne Parr, Nathan "Carnage" Corbett and Dmitri Valent, which were televised nationally on Fox Sports.

From 13 November 2009 to 16 April 2011 Curovic was the representative and promoter of WKN in Australia, with Domination 4, 5 and 6 events.

Curovic opened an authentic Muay Thai gym, Kao Sok, ("Kao" means knee and "Sok" means elbow in Thai), in Canning Vale in 1996.

As a fighter, Curovic won Western Australia, National and Commonwealth titles as well as representing Australia on numerous occasions at IFMA World Muay Thai Championships including winning two bronze medals (2003 & 2004). He fought against Eugene Ekkelboom, Dmitry Shakuta, Evan Thermalakis, Sam Solomon, Dom Devanna.

See also
List of male kickboxers

References

External links
Kao Sok Muay Thai gym - official website
Domination Fight Night website

1966 births
Australian male kickboxers
Living people
People from Western Australia

ja:ジョン・ウェイン・パー